Amazing Cooking Kids is a 2011 Philippine television reality cooking competition show broadcast by GMA Network. Hosted by Carmina Villaroel, it premiered on April 16, 2011. The show concluded on July 16, 2011 with a total of 12 episodes.

The series is streaming online on YouTube.

Contestants
Top 18
 Angela Rosales - Quezon City - Most Amazing Cooking Kids 11 yrs old
 Ronin Leviste - Mindoro - 1st runner up 11 yrs old
 Duday Reyes - Quezon City - 2nd runner up 11 yrs old
 Budik Villalobos - Cebu - Eliminated 9th 9 yrs old
 Tasha Pulgado - Bulacan - Eliminated 8th 11 yrs old
 Xymon Caballero - Caloocan - Eliminated 7th 11 yrs old
 Pat Reyes - Mandaluyong - Eliminated 6th 12 yrs old
 Dingdong Lagman - Cagayan de Oro City - Eliminated 5th 12 yrs old
 Paulo Sablaya - Quezon City - Eliminated 4th 10 yrs old
 Ice Almalmani - Parañaque - Eliminated 3rd  9 yrs old
 Nica Fortuno - Batangas- Eliminated 2nd 9 yrs old
 Tarah Santos - Muntinlupa - Eliminated 1st 9 yrs old

Call-out order

 The contestant won the competition.
 The contestant won the week's reward challenge.
 The contestant was eliminated.

In episode 3, everybody won the reward challenge.
In episode 5, the kids were divided into two groups. Budik and Ronin were the best of the Group 1 while Pat, Xymon, and Tasha were the best of the Group 2. While Pat was deemed as the over-all best. The call-out order from 2-5 was arranged according to the group and time they have finished.
In episode 6, Tasha and Xymon won the reward challenge.
In episode 7, Duday and Xymon was in a non-elimination bottom-2.
In episode 8, Dingdong was back because of Angela's powers to get some eliminated contestant to help her, but if their team won Dingdong will come back but not he is out.
In episode 11, Angela and Ronin won the reward challenge.

Judges
Rosebud Benitez - a chef and host of, Quickfire.
Jackie Ang-Po - a chef, owner of Fleur De Lys Patisserie and former host of the shows, True Confections and Delcioso!.
GB Barlao - a chef, vice president of Magsaysay Center for Hospitality and Culinary Arts.

Challenges
 Episode 1: Specialty dish
 Episode 2: Asian food
 Episode 3: Seafood
 Episode 4: Rice topping
 Episode 5: Ice cream dessert
 Episode 6: Pinoy dish
 Episode 7: Picnic plate
 Episode 8: Pasta dish
 Episode 9: Cake
 Episode 10: Chicken dish
 Episode 11: Signature dish of GB Barlao
 Episode 12: World class Pinoy dishes

Ratings
According to AGB Nielsen Philippines' Mega Manila household television ratings, the pilot episode of Amazing Cooking Kids earned an 11.7% rating.

Accolades

References

External links
 
 

2011 Philippine television series debuts
2011 Philippine television series endings
Filipino-language television shows
GMA Network original programming
Philippine reality television series